Feral parakeets in Great Britain are wild-living, non-native parakeets that are an introduced species into Great Britain. The population mainly consists of ring-necked parakeets (Psittacula krameri), a non-migratory species of bird native to Africa and the Indian Subcontinent, with a few, small breeding populations of monk parakeets, and other occasional escaped cage birds. The origins of these birds are subject of speculation, but they are generally thought to have bred from birds that escaped from captivity or were released.
 
The British rose-ringed parakeet or ring-necked parakeet population is mostly concentrated in suburban areas of London and the Home Counties of South-East England, and for this reason the birds are sometimes known as "Kingston parakeets" or "Twickenham parakeets", after the London suburbs of Kingston upon Thames and Twickenham. The parakeets breed rapidly and have spread beyond these areas: Flocks have been sighted in other parts of Britain. Separate feral rose-ringed parakeet populations exist in and around other European cities.

Origin of the birds

How exactly the ring-necked parakeet population first came to exist and thrive in the wild in England is not known; however, theories abound, most centred around a pair or more of breeding parakeets that escaped or were released from captivity some time in the mid-1990s, consistent with the first widespread photographs of the birds.

More specific introduction theories explaining the origin of the birds have also been published:

 Parakeets that escaped from the branch of Ealing Studios used for the filming of The African Queen (Isleworth Studios) in 1951

 Parakeets that escaped from damaged aviaries during the Great Storm of 1987

 A pair of parakeets released by Jimi Hendrix in Carnaby Street, London, in the 1960s

 A number of parakeets reportedly escaped from a pet shop in Sunbury-on-Thames in 1970

Despite the number of theories associated with film studios and musicians, most ornithologists believe that the original birds likely escaped from aviaries before 1971. In terms of geographic origin, the British rose-ringed parakeets are thought to be a hybrid population of two Asian subspecies, P.k. borealis and P.k. manillensis.

Population in Britain

Despite the increase in notability and population size at the end of the 20th and beginning of the 21st centuries, escaped parakeets have been spotted in Britain since the 19th century. The earliest recorded sighting was in 1855 in Norfolk, and parakeets were also seen in Dulwich in 1893 and Brixton in 1894. 

Throughout the decades since, parakeets continued to variously escape captivity; however, populations repeatedly died out until 1969, when the population of parakeets began to breed and sustain itself in London for the first time. Beginning in Croydon, the parakeets spread to Wraysbury, Bromley, and Esher.

The numbers remained very low, however, until the mid-1990s, when the population appeared to start increasing rapidly. The population was estimated at 500 birds in 1983, reached 1,500 by 1996, and 5,800 in the London area in 2002 (sheltering in up to 5 roosts). The last official roost count, in 2012, recorded 32,000 parakeets in London. 

British ring-necked parakeets are most common in the south-east of England, including London suburbs, Surrey, Kent and Sussex. Parakeet populations have also been reported further north in Liverpool, Oxford, Birmingham, Manchester, Sheffield, Edinburgh, and Newcastle

Due to population growth and the relatively quick spread throughout Britain, estimates of parakeet numbers within the country vary. According to the London Natural History Society, in the early 2000s the largest population of rose-ringed parakeets was believed to exist in the South London suburbs, where the birds roosted principally in Esher Rugby Ground, Esher until 2007 (Esher Rugby Club named its women's team "The Parakeets" in a tribute to the birds). The Royal Society for the Protection of Birds (RSPB) estimates there to be around 8,600 breeding pairs in Britain. Other scientific counts conducted in 2012 placed the number at around 32,000 birds.

Ecological impact
Concerns have been raised by Dr. Hazel Jackson, an expert in invasive species and conservation at the University of Kent, over the impact of the growing numbers of rose-ringed parakeets in south-east England. Scientific research programmes have analysed the behaviour of parakeets and found that they compete with native bird species and bats for food and nesting sites. Although not aggressive, parakeets have been shown to deter smaller birds due to their behaviour and noise; their large size means that they often crowd small bird feeders, further increasing competition for resources and disrupting local ecosystems.

The detrimental effect of competitive exclusion has been likened to the impact of the introduction of grey squirrel on the red squirrel. However, rose-ringed parakeets do have natural predators native to Britain: Ornithologists have observed an increase in the population of birds of prey in London, and have reported sparrowhawks, peregrine falcons, and hobbies preying on parakeets.

Rose-ringed parakeets are considered a pest in many countries such as Israel, where large swarms of parakeets can have a devastating effect on certain crops, and there is concern that the rapidly growing parakeet population could have unforeseen environmental impact in Britain. In 2009, the governmental wildlife organisation Natural England added feral parakeets to the “general licence”, a list of wild species that can be lawfully culled without the need for specific permission. Feral monk parakeets (Myiopsitta monachus) were subsequently also covered by the licence. In March 2021, the Department for Environment, Food and Rural Affairs stated that no cull of the ring-necked parakeet population in the UK was planned.

See also 
 British avifauna
 Feral parrot
 List of birds of Great Britain
 List of non-native birds of Great Britain
 Monk parakeet – another feral parakeet species, also found in Britain.

References

External links 

 — observations of the parakeets in Battersea, London

Psittacula
Feral parrots
Birds in the United Kingdom
Parakeets